Biombos is an album by the artist Telectu, released on the Chinese state-owned record company China Record Corporation in 1994.

Track listing
Beijing Suite -20:58	
 Slow Fox -7:40		
 Waltz -8:13		
 Cherry Fox -8:18		
 Slow Fox -9:01		
 Trane Fox -5:53		
 Sasa Fox -6:29		
 Waltz -4:55		
Imperial Bird Whistles -1:01

References

1994 albums
Telectu albums